Gatacre may refer to:

Galfry Gatacre or Gataker (1907–1983), Australian naval officer
Thomas Gatacre, 16th-century English politician and cleric
William Gatacre (MP) (died 1577), English politician 
William Forbes Gatacre (1843–1906), British soldier in India

See also 
 Gateacre